Tittibhasana (Sanskrit: टिट्टिभासन Ṭiṭṭibhāsana) or Firefly pose is an arm-balancing asana with the legs stretched out forwards in hatha yoga and modern yoga as exercise. Variants include Bhujapidasana, with the legs crossed at the ankle, and Eka Hasta Bhujasana, with one leg stretched out forwards.

Etymology and origins

The name Tittibhasana comes from Sanskrit: Ṭiṭṭibha, "small insect, firefly", and āsana, "posture" or "seat". Indian folklore tells the story of a pair of Tittibha birds that nested by the sea; the ocean swept away their eggs, and the birds complained to Vishnu, asking for the eggs to be returned. The god gave the order, and the sea gave the eggs back. The effectiveness of the small weak birds is said to be used as a symbol of yoga, able to overcome the power of illusion in the world.

The name Bhujapidasana (IAST: Bhujapīḍāsana) comes from Bhuja meaning "arm" or "shoulder", and Pīḍa meaning "pressure". The pose is described and illustrated in the 19th century Sritattvanidhi as Mālāsana, garland pose; that name is given to a different asana in Light on Yoga. The pose is described in the 20th century in Krishnamacharya's 1935 Yoga Makaranda, and it was taken up by his pupils Pattabhi Jois in his Ashtanga Vinyasa Yoga and B. K. S. Iyengar in his Light on Yoga.

Description

Tittibhasana is described in Light on Yoga as being entered from Dvi Pada Sirsasana, a difficult sitting pose with the legs crossed behind the head, that in Iyengar's words "requires practice", by uncrossing the ankles, stretching the legs straight up, and pushing down on the hands to balance. It is an intermediate level asana in Ashtanga vinyasa yoga.

Variations 

Bhujapidasana, Shoulder Pressing Pose, is similar, with the thighs resting on the upper arms, but the legs are crossed at the ankle in front of the body. 

Eka Hasta Bhujasana, Elephant's Trunk Pose or One Leg Over Arm Balance, has one leg stretched out straight forwards between the supporting arms.

See also 

 Bakasana – a hand balancing pose, with the shins resting on the upper arms

References

Sources 

 
 

Balancing asanas